Craigslea State High School is a public secondary school located in Chermside West in the northern suburbs of Brisbane, Queensland, Australia. The school first opened in 1975 and was officially opened in 2000 by the honourable Dean Wells. The school is situated next door to Craigslea State Primary School and some facilities, such as the swimming pool, are shared between the two schools.

It is also reputedly the first completely low-set public secondary school in Queensland and several of the buildings' entrance points have since been modified to provide convenient access to students in motorised wheelchairs. Most of the school's buildings were built in the mid-1970s, whereas the mid-2000s saw the opening of the school's auditorium and another building for the senior subject of commercial hospitality, which was established at the school in 2007. The grounds outside the science building and the library courtyard feature artworks created by the school's students, and from end 2010 to the start of 2011 school year the school was upgrading both Science and Year 8 Blocks, however due to many faults in the science block and having to close down again after it opened, it was not officially open until last term of 2011. In late 2012, the school undertook the construction of a new building to accommodate the growing needs of the school.

From 2015, Year 7 became the first year of high school in Queensland.

Enrolments for each year level in February 2019 totalled between 108 (Year 12) and 200 (Year 7) students, giving in the school a total population of 1003 students. According to the Census (August) enrolment collection, the school's student population ranged between 970 and 994 from 2015 to 2018.

See also
 List of schools in Queensland
 Queensland State High Schools

References

External links
 Craigslea State High School official website

Public high schools in Brisbane
Educational institutions established in 1975
1975 establishments in Australia